Ben Goertzel is a cognitive scientist, artificial intelligence researcher, CEO and founder of SingularityNET, leader of the OpenCog Foundation, and the AGI Society, and chair of Humanity+. He helped popularize the term 'artificial general intelligence'.

Early life and education
Three of Goertzel's Jewish great-grandparents emigrated to New York from Lithuania and Poland. Goertzel's father is Ted Goertzel, a former professor of sociology at Rutgers University. Goertzel left high school after the tenth grade to attend Bard College at Simon's Rock, where he graduated with a bachelor's degree in Quantitative Studies. Goertzel graduated with a PhD in mathematics from Temple University under the supervision of Avi Lin in 1990, at age 23.

Career
Goertzel is the founder and CEO of SingularityNET, a project combining artificial intelligence and blockchain to democratize access to artificial intelligence. He was a Director of Research of the Machine Intelligence Research Institute. He is also chief scientist and chairman of AI software company Novamente LLC; chairman of the OpenCog Foundation; and advisor to Singularity University.

Goertzel was the Chief Scientist of Hanson Robotics, the company that created Sophia the Robot.

Views on AI 
Dr. Goertzel is a leading developer of the OpenCog framework for artificial general intelligence. He has published many technical papers on the OpenCog architecture.

In May 2007, Goertzel spoke at a Google tech talk about his approach to creating artificial general intelligence. He defines intelligence as the ability to detect patterns in the world and in the agent itself, measurable in terms of emergent behavior of "achieving complex goals in complex environments". A "baby-like" artificial intelligence is initialized, then trained as an agent in a simulated or virtual world such as Second Life to produce a more powerful intelligence. Knowledge is represented in a network whose nodes and links carry probabilistic truth values as well as "attention values", with the attention values resembling the weights in a neural network. Several algorithms operate on this network, the central one being a combination of a probabilistic inference engine and a custom version of evolutionary programming.

The 2012 documentary The Singularity by independent filmmaker Doug Wolens showcased Goertzel's vision and understanding of making artificial general intelligence.

Bibliography

See also
 Artificial general intelligence
 Paraconsistent logic

References

External links

Ben Goertzel at arXiv.org
TEDxBerkeley – "Decentralized AI" (video:16min, March 2019)
SingularityNET

1966 births
American agnostics
20th-century American mathematicians
21st-century American mathematicians
American roboticists
American technology company founders
American people of Brazilian-Jewish descent
Artificial intelligence researchers
Human–computer interaction researchers
American technology writers
Machine learning researchers
Complex systems scientists
Computer graphics researchers
Brazilian people of Jewish descent
Systems scientists
Chaos theorists
American bioinformaticians
Living people
Jewish agnostics
Extropians
Cyborgs
Futurologists
Pantheists
Cyberneticists
Data miners
Life extensionists
People from Rio de Janeiro (city)
Brazilian emigrants to the United States
New York University alumni
Temple University alumni
Academic staff of the University of Waikato
University of New Mexico faculty
Academic staff of the University of Western Australia
City University of New York faculty
University of Nevada, Las Vegas faculty
Academic staff of Xiamen University
Singularitarians
Cosmists
Critics of conspiracy theories
American transhumanists
Parapsychologists